The 1989 Coupe de Dijon was the second round of the 1989 World Sportscar Championship season. It took place at the Circuit Dijon-Prenois, France on 21 May 1989.

Official results
Class winners in bold. Cars failing to complete 75% of winner's distance marked as Not Classified (NC).

Statistics
 Pole position - #62 Team Sauber Mercedes - 1:07.275
 Fastest lap - #61 Team Sauber Mercedes - 1:11.739
 Average speed - 178.339 km/h

References

 

Dijon
Dijon